Biberbach is a village in the district of Amstetten in Lower Austria in Austria.

Geography
Biberbach lies in the Mostviertel  in Lower Austria in the hills between the Ybbs River and the Url River.

References

Cities and towns in Amstetten District